Neufbosc is a commune in the Seine-Maritime department in the Normandy region in northern France.

The inhabitants of the town of Neufbosc are called Neufboscois, Neufboscoises in French.

Geography

Population

Places of interest
 The church of St.Jean & St.Nicolas, dating from the nineteenth century.
 Traces of a feudal castle.

See also
Communes of the Seine-Maritime department

References

Communes of Seine-Maritime